Gongqing Forest Park is the second-largest park in the city of Shanghai. It is located in the Yangpu District in the north section of the city. To reach the park you can take line 8 on the metro to Shiguang Road.  From the metro station the park is a less than 1 km; walk or take a very short taxi ride to it.  Being further out the park is somewhat less crowded than Century Park, the largest park of the city.

The northern part is the larger one and features most of the amusements and activities of the park i.e., rock climbing, horse riding, kart racing, toboggan ride and roller coasters etc.
The southern part is home to mini lakes and beautiful ponds which enhance the scenic beauty of the area.
There is also an indoor exhibition of various plants and a Hongsen Forest Park Hotel.

References
 Parks of Shanghai (Shanghai Expat)

External links
Official website 

Parks in Shanghai
Forests of China
Forest parks in China